Un argentino en New York (international, English title: An Argentine in New York) is a 1998 Argentine film directed by Juan José Jusid and starring Guillermo Francella and Natalia Oreiro. It is the story of an Argentine adolescent girl who travels to New York, and decides to stay and live there. Her father makes the decision to go to New York, a place where he has never been, to meet his daughter and try to bring her back to Buenos Aires. During his journey he’ll discover that his daughter has grown, formed a music band and met an American man who she loves.

Plot
Un argentino en New York tells us the story of Franco Ricci (Guillermo Francella) and his daughter Veronica (Natalia Oreiro). Franco is a porteño who is very sentimental, a musician, separated and with a couple of dreams. Veronica, a brave young girl, attractive and intelligent, who always obtains what she wants.

While Veronica was traveling through New York, she surprisingly decided to stay and live in the city. When Franco, her father, hears the news, he decides to travel and pay her a visit with the goal of bringing her back to Argentina.

Even though it’s hard for Franco to admit it, he’ll discover that in the past months Veronica has grown and is more mature. She has formed a music band called The Verónikos, they debuted in a café and they have shown that they could succeed in the music industry. She has also fallen in love of an American boy, George (Steve Wilson), which will bring jealousy to her father.

The movie takes place in New York, a vertiginous city and unknown to Franco, which will bring all different types of hilarious adventures. After the whole journey through Manhattan, it will bring all sorts of feelings between father and daughter, which will change their lives.

Between laughs and tears, Un argentino en New York shares with us the journey in which a father realizes that her daughter is no longer a teenager, and has turned into a woman.

Track listing

External links
 Natalia Oreiro Un argentino en New York info film
 NATALIA OREIRO - ČESKÁ OFICIÁLNÍ STRÁNKA - www.nataliaoreiro.cz
 Full Discography - Czech Fan Site
 Soundtracks - Czech Fan Site

External links
 
 Natalia Oreiro Official Site

1998 films
1990s Spanish-language films
Films set in the United States
Films scored by Federico Jusid
Argentine comedy films
1998 comedy films